USS Serapis (IX-213) was a single-screw tanker that served for a short time as a floating storage tanker for the United States Navy at the end of World War II.

Built in 1921 for the United States Shipping Board by Baltimore Dry Dock and Shipbuilding, Baltimore, Maryland, the ship was originally named SS District of Columbia. Allocated to the Navy by the Maritime Commission in February 1945, renamed Serapis, and designated IX-213 on 9 March 1945, she was partially converted at San Francisco and delivered to the Navy at Pearl Harbor. The ship was commissioned on 3 August 1945.

Service history
Acquired for temporary wartime use as a mobile floating storage unit for gasoline and diesel oil at Pearl Harbor and in the Trust Territories, Serapis was declared surplus after the cessation of hostilities in the Pacific.

On 2 October, she arrived at San Francisco where she was decommissioned and returned to the Maritime Commission on 19 October. Her name was struck from the Navy List on 1 November 1945, and she was sold in May 1947 to the American Iron and Metal Company for scrapping.

References

External links
 Photo gallery at navsource.org

Unclassified miscellaneous vessels of the United States Navy
Ships built in Baltimore
1920 ships